Keith Virgil Lockhart (born November 10, 1964) is an American former major league second baseman and third baseman who played for 10 seasons in Major League Baseball from -.

Lockhart, a left-handed batter, played college baseball at Oral Roberts University and was originally drafted by Cincinnati Reds in the 11th round of the  Amateur Draft. He spent 8 full seasons in the minor league systems of three different organizations before earning a spot on the San Diego Padres' opening day roster in 1994. He played in 27 games with the Padres in his first year before leaving as a free agent and signing with the Kansas City Royals during the 1994 season.

In his first season, he batted a career best .321, earning him a role as a platoon player in 1996. Sharing time at second base with Bip Roberts and at third base with Joe Randa and Craig Paquette, Lockhart hit .273 and drove in 55 runs.

Shortly before the start of the  season, Lockhart and outfielder Michael Tucker were traded to the Atlanta Braves for outfielder Jermaine Dye, and Rule V selection Jamie Walker.

He primarily served as a reserve second baseman and also served as a pinch hitter, contributing 59 pinch hits as a Brave.

He came close to being the hero of the Braves' epic struggle with the New York Mets in Game 5 of the 1999 NLCS. Lockhart, who came into the game as a replacement after Bret Boone was pinch-run for, hit an RBI triple in the 15th inning to give the Braves a 3–2 lead. The lead was squandered in the bottom of the inning, however, after a bases loaded walk tied the game; Robin Ventura's famed Grand Slam Single would later win it for the Mets.

In 2003, he returned to San Diego for what would be his last major league season and served as the backup to Mark Loretta. He retired at season's end with a .261 career batting average, 44 career home runs, and 268 runs batted in.

Lockhart was the final out of the 1999 World Series. Facing Mariano Rivera, he flied out to Chad Curtis in left field.

In 2011, his son Danny became a 10th round draft pick for the Cubs and has signed with their farm team.

Sources

External links

Keith Lockhart at SABR (Baseball BioProject)
Keith Lockhart at Baseball Almanac
Keith Lockhart at Keith Lockhard - Baseballbiography.com
Keith Lockhart at Pura Pelota (Venezuelan Professional Baseball League)

1964 births
Living people
Atlanta Braves players
Baseball players from California
Billings Mustangs players
Cedar Rapids Reds players
Chattanooga Lookouts players
Chicago Cubs scouts
Kansas City Royals players
Las Vegas Stars (baseball) players
Louisville Redbirds players
Major League Baseball second basemen
Nashville Sounds players
Omaha Royals players
Oral Roberts Golden Eagles baseball players
Oral Roberts University alumni
Portland Beavers players
San Diego Padres players
Sportspeople from Whittier, California
Tacoma Tigers players
Tiburones de La Guaira players
American expatriate baseball players in Venezuela
Alaska Goldpanners of Fairbanks players